Johann Georg Bergmüller (15 April 1688 – 2 April 1762) was a German painter, particularly of frescoes, of the Baroque.

Life 
Bergmüller was born in Türkheim near Buchloe (now in Bavaria) and received his first artistic education at his father's cabinet making workshop. From 1702 until 1708 he was apprenticed to the court painter  in Munich. In 1711 he went on cultural journey to the Netherlands in order to broaden his horizon. 

He became a Master Painter and received the citizenship of Augsburg later that year. He also married Barbara Kreutzerin, with whom he had ten children, one of which, became a fresco painter too, as well as a renowned copperplate engraver and art theorist.

Bergmüller quickly acquired a high reputation in Augsburg and created numerous works of art, few of which have survived however. He became the most important teacher of fresco painting at the Imperial City of Augsburg Academy, founded in 1710. His style of composition and his motifs were influential on his pupils. In 1723 he published Anthropometria, a textbook on the theory of proportions. He became the Catholic director of the academy alongside his Protestant counterpart, in 1730, and remained in this function until his death in Augsburg in 1762.

Gallery

Works 
 1710: ceiling frescoes in Kreuzpullach near Munich
 1721: fresco-cycle at St Mary's Chapel (designed by Eichstätt court architect Gabriel de Gabrieli in Augsburg Cathedral
 1721: Sacred Heart fresco-cycle at monastery church, Eichstätt
 altar painting at Dominican Church St Peter, Eichstätt
 altar painting at Jesuit Church, Eichstätt
 altar painting at parish and monastery church St Walpurga, Eichstätt
 1727 - 1729: frescoes in abbey church St George at Ochsenhausen Abbey
 1736: frescoes in Dießen am Ammersee
 altar paintings at parish church Aulzhausen

Authorship 
 Johann Georg Bergmüller: Anthropometria, Augsburg 1723
 His authorship of some paintings (side altars) thanks to restoration work at Guardian Angel Church in Eichstätt has been called into question.

Further reading 
 DaCosta Kaufmann, Thomas (1979). Court, Cloister, and City: The Art and Culture of Central Europe, 1450-1800. Chicago: University Of Chicago Press. 
 Epple, Alois (ed.) (1988). Johann Georg Bergmüller, 1688-1762. Zur 300. Wiederkehr seines Geburtsjahres. Ausstellung im Schloß Türkheim. Weißenhorn: A.H. Konrad. .
 Kaltenbrunner, Regina (ed.) (2004). Johann Georg Bergmüller: 1688 - 1762, die Zeichnungen. Salzburg: Salzburger Barockmuseum. .

External links 

 Thomas Aquinas (drawing by Johann Georg Bergmüller)
 Apollo and the Muses (oil painting by Johann Georg Bergmüller)
 Draft for ceiling painting

References

1688 births
1762 deaths
People from Unterallgäu
18th-century German painters
18th-century German male artists
German male painters